The Walls Will Fall is an EP by American beatdown hardcore band Terror. It was released via Pure Noise Records on April 28, 2017.

Track listing

References

2017 EPs
Pure Noise Records EPs
Terror (band) albums